Frampton, meaning "farmstead on the River Frome", may refer to:

Places 
Frampton, New South Wales, Australia
Frampton, Quebec, Canada

United Kingdom 
Frampton, Dorset
Frampton, Lincolnshire
Frampton on Severn, Gloucestershire
Frampton Cotterell, Gloucestershire
Frampton Mansell, Gloucestershire
Frampton, Vale of Glamorgan
 Frampton (liberty)
 Frampton West End
Frampton Court, a Grade I listed country house and estate in Frampton-on-Severn, Gloucestershire, England
Frampton Pools, a biological Site of Special Scientific Interest in Gloucestershire
Frampton Priory, a priory in Dorset, England.

Other uses 
Frampton (surname)
Frampton (album), album by Peter Frampton
Frampton Comes Alive!, another Peter Frampton album
George T. Frampton (born 1944), American attorney
Lorna Frampton (1920–2009), English backstroke swimmer 
 Mary Frampton (1773 – 1846), English diarist and botanist
Owen Frampton (1919–2005), English art teacher.
Stephen Frampton (born 1969), Irish sportsperson. 
Tregonwell Frampton (1641–1727)

See also